HMS Creole was a  destroyer of the Royal Navy built by J. Samuel White, Cowes between 1944 and 1946. She was sold to the Pakistan Navy in 1958 and renamed PNS Alamgir. She was scrapped in 1982.

History in the Royal Navy
Commissioned too late for service in the Second World War, her pennant number was soon changed to D82. Along with HMS Crispin she was the only 'Cr' group ship to see service with the Royal Navy - the rest served with another navies. Both served with the 3rd Training Squadron based in Londonderry Port. Both ships had their 'B' gun turret removed in 1948 and replaced with a deckhouse. In 1953 she took part in the Coronation Review of the Fleet to celebrate the Coronation of Queen Elizabeth II. In 1954 both ships were laid up in reserve.

History in the Pakistan Navy

Creole was sold to the Pakistan Navy on 29 February 1956 and renamed Alamgir. Before being transferred she was given a refit by Thornycroft at Woolston. As part of this refit the gun turret was reinstated in 'B' position.  The gun at 'X' position was removed and replaced by two Squid anti-submarine mortars. She was formally handed over to the Pakistan Navy at Southampton in 1958. The refit and transfer was made under a US contract and transferred to the Pakistan Navy as part of the Military Assistance Program.

Alamgir continued to serve in the Pakistan Navy until scrapped in 1982.

References

Publications
 
 

 

C-class destroyers (1943) of the Royal Navy
1945 ships
World War II destroyers of the United Kingdom
Cold War destroyers of the United Kingdom
C-class destroyers (1943) of the Pakistan Navy